Andrew McCabe (born 29 August 1990 in Longreach, Queensland) is an Australian track and field sprinter.  He was a member of the Australian 4 × 100 m relay team that equalled the Australian record when they qualified for the finals at the 2012 London Olympics.

References

External links
Profile  at London2012.com
Profile at Australian Olympic Team
Profile at Athletics Australia

1990 births
Living people
Australian male sprinters
Athletes (track and field) at the 2012 Summer Olympics
Olympic athletes of Australia
World Athletics Championships athletes for Australia
Sportsmen from Queensland